This article lists the results for the Northern Ireland national under-21 football team from 1978 to 2019.

1970s

1978

1990s

1990

1994

1998

1999

2000s

2000

2001

2002

2003

2004

2005

2006

2007

2008

2009

2010s

2010

2011

2012

2013

2014

2015

2016

2017

2018

2019

References

External links
Irish Football Association
Northern Ireland U-21 at Soccerway
Northern Ireland Under-21 International Matches
Northern Ireland U21 at World Football
Northern Ireland - Under-21 - UEFA.com

Northern Ireland national under-21 football team